Ángel Luis Alcaraz Acosta (born June 20, 1941 in Humacao, Puerto Rico) is a former professional second baseman.  Alcaraz was signed as a free agent by the Milwaukee Braves of Major League Baseball (MLB) on January 1, 1959 and then traded to the Los Angeles Dodgers before the  season. He spent several seasons in the minor leagues before making his Major League debut on September 13, 1967 for the Dodgers against the San Francisco Giants.

After two seasons in Los Angeles, he was purchased from the Dodgers by the Kansas City Royals on October 21, 1968. He played for the Royals for two more seasons and then was traded by the Royals to the Chicago White Sox on March 30, 1971 for Bobby Knoop.

See also
 List of Major League Baseball players from Puerto Rico

External links

Luis Alcaraz at Baseball Almanac

1941 births
Living people
Albuquerque Dodgers players
Albuquerque Dukes players
Artesia Dodgers players
Bravos de León players
Cachorros de León players
Cafeteros de Córdoba players
Charleston Charlies players
Kansas City Royals players
Keokuk Dodgers players
Los Angeles Dodgers players
Major League Baseball players from Puerto Rico
Major League Baseball second basemen
Mexican League baseball managers
Midwest Dodgers players
McCook Braves players
Omaha Royals players
Orlando Dodgers players
People from Humacao, Puerto Rico
Petroleros de Poza Rica players
Puerto Rican expatriate baseball players in Mexico
Richmond Braves players
Salem Dodgers players
Santa Barbara Dodgers players
Santa Barbara Rancheros players
Spokane Indians players
Tucson Toros players